Wayne Carleton Smith (December 4, 1901 – November 13, 1964) was a major general in the United States Army.

Early life

Smith was born in St. Joseph, Missouri. He enlisted in the United States Army on January 30, 1920 and was subsequently appointed to the United States Military Academy at West Point. Smith entered the Military Academy in 1921 and graduated on June 12, 1925. His first assignment was as a platoon leader of the 15th Infantry in Tientsin, China. He later graduated from the Command and General Staff School in 1940.

World War II
During World War II, Smith served in the Pacific Theater as Chief of Staff of the Central Pacific Base Command from 1943 to 1945 and was promoted to brigadier general in 1944. He received the Soldier's Medal for saving two lives in the waters off Hawaii. Smith also received the Legion of Merit and the Bronze Star Medal for his wartime service.

After the war, Smith served as an assistant commanding general of X Corps and of the 45th Infantry Division.

Korean War
Smith briefly commanded the 11th Airborne Division at Fort Campbell, Kentucky from November 1951 to January 1952. He was then given command of the 7th Infantry Division, serving in combat in Korea, in July 1952. He was promoted to major general in September of the same year. He was a key commander during the Battle of Triangle Hill. He relieved of command by Major General Arthur Trudeau in March 1953. For his service with the 7th Infantry Division, Smith was awarded the Distinguished Service Cross and the Army Distinguished Service Medal. He also received the Air Medal.

Later career
Following the Korean War, Smith returned as commander of the 11th Airborne Division from May 1953 to May 1955. Shortly after his return from Korea, Smith qualified as a Master Parachutist at age 52. He then served as chief of staff to the Joint United States Military Advisory Group in the Philippines from 1955 to 1957.

Retirement and death
Smith retired from the army on January 31, 1957. He died in Farmington, Maine, in 1964. Smith is buried with his wife in the Post Cemetery at West Point.

Awards
Master Parachutist Badge
Distinguished Service Cross
Army Distinguished Service Medal
Legion of Merit
Soldier's Medal
Bronze Star Medal
Air Medal
American Defense Service Medal
American Campaign Medal
European-African-Middle Eastern Campaign Medal
Asiatic-Pacific Campaign Medal 
World War II Victory Medal
Army of Occupation Medal
National Defense Service Medal
Korean Service Medal with two campaign stars
Republic of Korea Presidential Unit Citation
United Nations Korea Medal
Korean War Service Medal

Distinguished Service Cross citation
GENERAL ORDERS:
Headquarters, Eighth U.S. Army, Korea: General Orders No. 57 (February 25, 1955)

The President of the United States of America, under the provisions of the Act of Congress approved July 9, 1918, takes pleasure in presenting the Distinguished Service Cross to Major General Wayne Carleton Smith (ASN: 0-16207), United States Army, for extraordinary heroism in connection with military operations against an armed enemy of the United Nations while serving as Commanding General of the 7th Infantry Division. Major General Smith distinguished himself by extraordinary heroism in action against enemy aggressor forces in the vicinity of Kumhwa, Korea, during the period 14 through 17 October 1952. When the Seventh Infantry Division was committed to wrest the strongly defended Hill 598 from a numerically superior hostile force, General Smith assumed the position at an extremely vulnerable observation post in order to closely direct the attack upon the enemy, and remained at this vantage point throughout the first morning's operations despite dangerously accurate shelling of the area by Communist forces. Realizing that the assault echelons were halted short of their objective by devastating fires, heavy casualties, and adverse terrain, he immediately left the comparative safety of the observation post to personally reorganize his command for renewed attack and instill in the troops the will to win. Exposing himself to intense hostile fire, he traveled throughout the battle area, sharing the hazards and discomforts of his men, encouraging them to maximum effort, and supervising critical supply and evaluation activities. As a result of his presence in forward areas and sincere concern for the welfare of his troops, morale surged upward, enemy defenses were overrun, and highly strategic terrain was secured by the Seventh Infantry Division. Throughout the remainder of the action, he was constantly in the danger area, employing sound military tactics and forceful leadership to inspire his men to successfully repulse large-scale enemy counteroffensives, enable rapid relief of combat-weary battalions, and insure expeditious organization and consolidating of the newly-adjusted main line of resistance. Dominating and controlling the vital situation through sheer force of his heroic example, General Smith's valorous conduct and demonstrated courage under fire contributed significantly to the United Nations' first armed bid for world peace.

References

Bibliography 

 
 
 

Generals of World War II

1964 deaths
1901 births
People from St. Joseph, Missouri
United States Army soldiers
Military personnel from Missouri
United States Military Academy alumni
United States Army Command and General Staff College alumni
United States Army generals of World War II
Recipients of the Soldier's Medal
Recipients of the Legion of Merit
United States Army generals
United States Army personnel of the Korean War
Recipients of the Air Medal
Recipients of the Distinguished Service Cross (United States)
Recipients of the Distinguished Service Medal (US Army)
Burials at West Point Cemetery